The Day of the Owl (released in the United States as Mafia)  is a 1968 crime drama film directed by Damiano Damiani, based on the 1961 novel of the same name by Leonardo Sciascia, adapted for the screen by Damiani and Ugo Pirro. It stars Franco Nero, Claudia Cardinale, and Lee J. Cobb. Set in a small Sicilian town, the story follows a Carabinieri chief investigating a murder, hampered by the deep-seated presence of the Mafia that perpetuates a culture of silence.

The film was nominated for the Golden Bear at the 1968 Berlin International Film Festival and won three David di Donatello Awards; Best Film, Best Actor (for Nero), and Best Actress (for Cardinale).

Plot
In Sicily, truck driver Salvatore Colasberna is murdered while delivering a load of cement to a highway construction project. The murder takes place within sight and earshot of the house of Rosa Nicolosi (Cardinale) and her husband. Police captain Bellodi (Nero) hears that there may be irregularities in the construction of the highway that amount to corruption. He is also told that Rosa has loose morals, though she denies it strenuously and claims that she has been faithful to her husband.

Bellodi is unable to determine whether Colasberna was murdered because he stumbled onto a corruption racket or because he was a lover of Rosa, and was shot by her husband, who disappeared after the murder. Another possibility is that Nicolosi saw the murderer and was also murdered, or went into hiding fearing for his life.

Bellodi is thwarted by an honour system, where witnesses lie and withhold information out of allegiance to the local Mafia don, Mariano Arena (Cobb). He resorts to unorthodox strategies of jailing witnesses, forging statements, and confronting witnesses with false accusations by others, even going so far as arresting Arena.

Cast

Production
In 1967, director Elio Petri adapted Leonardo Sciascia's novel To Each His Own as We Still Kill the Old Way. The film was a box office hit in Italy, which led to producers Ermano Donati and Luigi Carpentieri to green-light the adaptation of another Sciascia novel they had purchased, The Day of the Owl. The script was developed by director Damiano Damiani and Ugo Pirro. Pirro had previously adapted To Each His Own for Petri's film. Damiani and Pirro created a radically different story from novel, with Pirro explaining that when writing "a script based on a novel, I usually don't respect the book's structure, To me, the book is a hint: I must try and preserve its message by using a different language." Pirro and Damiani retained the book's famous line where the character of Don Mariano splits humanity into five category: "men, half-men, pigmies, arse-crawlers, and quackers."

The Day of the Owl was filmed at Incir - De Paolis in Rome and on location in Partinico, Sicily where Damiani shot most of the film. Assistant director Mino Giarda would state that during filming, the production received anonymous threatening letters when filming in Sicily. Giarda specifically noted that one day someone had fired bullets at a truck carrying the dailies. Girada stated that dialogue in the script that made reference to the complicity between Italy's largest political party and the mafia was the reasoning behind the shooting.

Release
The Day of the Owl was released in Italy on 17 February 1968 where it was distributed by Euro International Films. On the film's initial release, it was labelled as forbidden to minors by the Board of Censors who declared it was banned due to frequent use of profanity, its "harsh and corrosive criticism of institutions" and a lack of a happy ending. This rating was removed later when a few lines were re-dubbed. The film grossed a total of 1,335,244,000 Italian lire on its initial theatrical run. The film was later released in France in 1969 with a runtime of 100 minutes.

The Day of the Owl was released on DVD as Mafia in the United States by Wild East. where it was released as part of a double feature with I Am the Law.

Reception
In Italy, producers Luigi Carpentieri and Ermanno Donati won the Nastro d'Argento award for Best Producer for the film. In a contemporary review, "Werb." of Variety referred to the film as "a skillfully-made, well-acted picture-blending social satire dramatic intensity and comic localisms, that should draw and hold audiences in all markets." "Werb." went on to state that three factors enhanced the film: the original novel by Leonardo Sciascia, the adaptation by Ugo Pirro and "Lee J. Cobb's outstanding performance, unsuspected thesping by Claudia Cardinale and a credible attempt from Franco Nero in a part calling for a more mature actor."

See also
 Claudia Cardinale filmography
 List of Italian films of 1968
 List of French films of 1968

Notes

References

External links
 

1968 films
1960s crime thriller films
1960s mystery films
Italian crime thriller films
1960s Italian-language films
English-language Italian films
1960s English-language films
Films about the Sicilian Mafia
Films based on Italian novels
Films set in Sicily
Poliziotteschi films
Films directed by Damiano Damiani
Films based on works by Leonardo Sciascia
Films with screenplays by Ugo Pirro
Films shot in Italy
Films scored by Giovanni Fusco
1960s Italian films